The 2017–18 High Point Panthers women's basketball team represents High Point University during the 2017–18 NCAA Division I women's basketball season. The Panthers, led by sixth-year head coach DeUnna Hendrix, play their home games at the Millis Athletic Convocation Center as members of the Big South Conference. They finished the season 17–14, 10–8 in Big South play to finish in fourth place. They advanced to the semifinals of the Big South women's tournament where they lost to Liberty.

Previous season
The 2016–17 team finished the season 15–15, 13-5 in Big South play to finish in third place. They lost 55-48 in the quarterfinals of the Big South tournament to Presbyterian.

Off-season

Departures

Recruits

Roster 
Reference:

Media

All Panthers home games and Big South games, excepting the Gardner-Webb road game, will be televised on the Big South Network. In addition, the road games against Ohio, Duke, Stetson, and Virginia Tech will be televised on ESPN3, the Norfolk State game will be televised on Spartan Showcase Video, and the UNC Greensboro game will be televised on SoCon Digital Network.

Schedule and results 

|-
!colspan=12 style=| Non-conference regular season

|-
!colspan=12 style=| Big South regular season

|-
!colspan=12 style=| Big South tournament

Individual statistics
Reference:

Season highs

References

High Point Panthers women's basketball seasons
High Point
High Point
High Point